Hypercompe hambletoni is a moth of the family Erebidae first described by William Schaus in 1938. It is found in Brazil.

Larvae have been recorded feeding on Bidens, Eriobotrya, Gossypium, Hibiscus, Manihot and Ricinus species.

References

Hypercompe
Moths described in 1938